Marek Božoň (17 April 1990 in Poprad) is a Slovak footballer who plays as a defender for the 2. liga club FK DAC 1904 Dunajská Streda.

External links
 MFK Dubnica profile 

1990 births
Living people
Slovak footballers
FK Dubnica players
MŠK Púchov players
FC DAC 1904 Dunajská Streda players
Slovak Super Liga players
Association football defenders
Sportspeople from Poprad